Guillaume de la Sudrie (la Sudré) (died 18 April 1373) was a French Dominican and Cardinal, born in Laguenne, Corrèze. He served as bishop of Marseille beginning in 1361.

He was made cardinal on 18 September 1366 by Pope Urban V and was Bishop of Ostia from 1367 to 1373.

External links
Salvador Miranda, The Cardinals of the Holy Roman Church,  Lasudre, Guillaume de, retrieved: 2016-10-22.

14th-century French cardinals
Cardinal-bishops of Ostia
Bishops of Marseille
French Dominicans
1373 deaths
Year of birth unknown